Lou Hon Kei is a Macanese racing driver currently competing in the TCR International Series. Having previously competed in the CEC Super Endurance Championship and Macau Touring Car Cup amongst others.

Racing career
Lou began his career in 2011 in the Macau Touring Car Series, he also raced in the Macau Road Sport Challenge that year. He continued in the Macau Touring Car Series for 2012 and 2013, finishing 10th in 2013. He took part in the Macau Touring Car Cup in 2013, finishing 5th. He switched to the CEC Super Endurance Championship for 2016.

In November 2016 it was announced that he would race in the TCR International Series, driving a SEAT León Cup Racer for Elegant Racing Team.

Racing record

Complete TCR International Series results
(key) (Races in bold indicate pole position) (Races in italics indicate fastest lap)

† Driver did not finish the race, but was classified as he completed over 90% of the race distance.

References

External links
 

Living people
TCR International Series drivers
Macau racing drivers
Year of birth missing (living people)